Lynette Lancini, born Lismore, 1970, is an Australian composer of a variety of works including orchestral, chamber, piano and vocal music.

Biography
Lynette Lancini studied music at the University of Queensland, the Australian Music Examinations Board, and the Queensland University of Technology. She is mostly self-taught as a composer, and she developed her lyrical neo folk/baroque musical style as a member of the new music collective Music for the Heart and Mind in the 1990s, with composers such as Robert Davidson, Tom Adeney, Jo-Anne Abbott, and Roland Adeney.

Lancini is a certified Wholebody Focusing Trainer, the practice of which has modified her style from abstract concert music towards more experimental, inner-directed and collaborative approaches.

Works
Lancini's works include a major cycle, Centaur, for Topology, and Overt Operation for orchestra, composed for the Queensland Symphony Orchestra. Her more recent works, megaMammal for the Piano Mill, Invocation of the Whole Living Body for Queensland Conservatorium Griffith University Amazing Women series and Musica Soma for the Muses Trio reflect her newer approaches.

References

External links
 Biography of Lynette Lancini - maintained by the Australian Music Centre
 

1970 births
20th-century classical composers
21st-century classical composers
Australian classical composers
Australian women classical composers
Living people
University of Queensland alumni
Queensland University of Technology alumni
20th-century women composers
21st-century women composers